Joseph Andrew Thatcher (born October 4, 1981) is an American college baseball coach and former professional baseball pitcher. He played in Major League Baseball (MLB) for the San Diego Padres, Arizona Diamondbacks, Los Angeles Angels of Anaheim and Houston Astros.

Early life
Thatcher was a member of Kokomo High School's baseball and basketball teams for four years; he was an all-region basketball player.   He was a freshman on the 1997 team that played in Indiana's final true state tournament and set a school record for 3-pointers in a game as a senior in 2000.

College career
Thatcher pitched for four seasons with Indiana State University. In 2003, he played collegiate summer baseball with the Bourne Braves of the Cape Cod Baseball League. He served as the Sycamores' closer in 2004, his final year with the team.

Professional career

River City Rascals
Thatcher was not drafted upon graduating college, he signed with the River City Rascals of the independent Frontier League, appearing in 47 games (6-5 W/L, 10 Saves) in 2004 and 2005.

Milwaukee Brewers
Thatcher was signed by the Milwaukee Brewers as a free agent in 2005 and assigned to the Rookie League Helena Brewers.

San Diego Padres
Thatcher had progressed to the Triple-A Nashville Sounds in 2007 when he was traded to the San Diego Padres, along with prospects Will Inman and Steve Garrison, for relief pitcher Scott Linebrink.  Thatcher was immediately placed in the bullpen of the Padres big league club.

Thatcher made his Major League debut with the Padres on July 26, in Houston against the Astros. He appeared in 22 games in 2007, finishing with a 2-2 record and 1.29 ERA.  He also appeared in 8 games with the Triple-A Portland Beavers.

Thatcher began  with the San Diego Padres, but was sent down to Portland in mid-May after posting a 6.75 ERA in 16 appearances.  He made nine more appearances with the big league club in 2008, the final one on July 23.  He finished the year with a 0-4 record and 8.42 ERA in San Diego.  With Portland, he posted a 2.77 ERA over 39 total innings.

Aside from five days in June and two weeks in mid-July, he remained with the Major League club through the remainder of the year. He finished 2009 with a 2.80 ERA in 45 innings across 52 games, and 55 strike-outs against 18 walks.

Thatcher emerged as one of the top left-handed specialists in the National League. He posted a 1.29 ERA in 35 innings and 65 games, with 45 strike-outs and 7 walks. He held batters to a .185 batting average and .465 OPS.

But the shoulder did not respond to treatment and he was forced to undergo surgery in May. The surgery cleaned up the labrum and the rotator cuff, and Thatcher rejoined the team in August after a rehab stint. He finished with a 4.50 ERA in 10 innings over 18 games.

In , Thatcher returned to his role as left-handed specialist.  He initially pitched through a nagging knee soreness that eventually forced him to rest the knee throughout August and then required arthroscopic to repair a tendon after the season. Thatcher still put up a 3.41 ERA and 39 strike-outs in 31 innings.  From 2009 through 2012, Thatcher appeared in 190 games and held left-handers to a .182 average.  Overall, he has a 2.66 ERA and .221 opponents batting average during that span.

Arizona Diamondbacks
Thatcher again began  as the Padres' left-handed specialist, pitching to a 2.10 ERA in 30 innings over 50 games.  At the end of July, the Padres traded Thatcher with Matt Stites and a compensatory draft pick to the Arizona Diamondbacks for Ian Kennedy.  With the Diamondbacks in 2013, Thatcher allowed 7 earned runs in 9 innings across 22 games.  In the off-season, Thatcher and the Diamondbacks agreed to a one-year contract to avoid arbitration.

Los Angeles Angels of Anaheim
On July 5, 2014, Thatcher was traded along with Tony Campana to the Los Angeles Angels of Anaheim in exchange for prospects Zach Borenstein and Joey Krehbiel.

Houston Astros

On February 13, 2015, Thatcher signed a minor league contract with the Houston Astros. On March 30, 2015, the Astros announced that Thatcher had made the Opening Day roster.  On July 21, 2015, the Astros designated Thatcher for assignment after 36 appearances. On August 2, Thatcher was resigned to a minor league deal. He was re-added to the major league roster on September 1.

Cleveland Indians
In December 2015, he signed a minor league contract with the Cleveland Indians. He was released in March 2016.

Los Angeles Dodgers 
In April 2016, he signed a minor league contract with the Los Angeles Dodgers. In 17 games, he had an ERA of 3.60. He was released on June 3, 2016 after exercising an opt-out clause in his contract.

Cleveland Indians
The Indians re-signed Thatcher to a minor league contract on July 23, 2016. He was released on August 13, 2016.

Chicago Cubs 
The Chicago Cubs signed Thatcher to a minor league contract on Aug 15, 2016. He retired after the season.

Coaching 
In 2016, after retiring from professional baseball, Thatcher accepted a position as associate coach of the Indiana University Kokomo baseball team.

Pitching style
Thatcher was unusual in that he threw only two pitches, neither of which was a four-seam fastball. He almost exclusively threw a cut fastball at 83–87 mph or a slider at 77–79. His slider was mainly a 2-strike pitch. Early in his career, he threw a changeup to right-handed hitters, but he threw only a small handful of those after the 2008 season.

Personal life
During the offseason, Thatcher resides in Kokomo, Indiana and enjoys playing golf on his down time. He is the son of Phil and Sara Thatcher and his father also pitched for Indiana State University while his mother was a cheerleader.

Thatcher's wife, Katie, is also a Kokomo native.  The couple formed the Joe and Katie Thatcher Endowment Foundation in 2008 to benefit the Howard County, Indiana, community.

Thatcher is a member of Catholic Athletes for Christ.

References

External links

1981 births
Living people
Sportspeople from Kokomo, Indiana
Baseball players from Indianapolis
Major League Baseball pitchers
San Diego Padres players
Arizona Diamondbacks players
Los Angeles Angels players
Houston Astros players
Indiana State Sycamores baseball players
River City Rascals players
Helena Brewers players
North Shore Honu players
Azucareros del Este players
American expatriate baseball players in the Dominican Republic
Brevard County Manatees players
West Virginia Power players
Huntsville Stars players
Nashville Sounds players
Portland Beavers players
Lake Elsinore Storm players
Tucson Padres players
Fresno Grizzlies players
Oklahoma City Dodgers players
Bourne Braves players